The Journal of the American College of Radiology (sometimes abbreviated JACR) is a monthly peer-reviewed medical journal covering radiology. It was established in 2004 and is published by Elsevier on behalf of the American College of Radiology, of which it is the official journal. The journal's founding editor-in-chief was Bruce J. Hillman (University of Virginia) with Ruth C. Carlos (University of Michigan) succeeding Hillman on January 1, 2019. It is sometimes called the "blue journal". According to the Journal Citation Reports, the journal has a 2020 impact factor of 5.532.

References

External links

Radiology and medical imaging journals
Publications established in 2004
Elsevier academic journals
Monthly journals
English-language journals
Academic journals associated with learned and professional societies of the United States